is a railway station on the Gonō Line in the town of Fukaura, Aomori Prefecture, Japan, operated by East Japan Railway Company (JR East).

Lines
, the station is served by just five services in each direction daily.

Station layout
Todoroki Station has a single side platform, serving bidirectional traffic. The station is unattended. The station building is a wooden structure built onto the platform.

History
The station was opened on December 13, 1934, as a station on the Japanese National Railways (JNR). With the privatization of the JNR on April 1, 1987, it came under the operational control of JR East.

Surrounding area

 Sea of Japan.

Gallery

See also 
 List of railway stations in Japan

References

External links

   

Stations of East Japan Railway Company
Railway stations in Aomori Prefecture
Gonō Line
Fukaura, Aomori
Railway stations in Japan opened in 1934